The Col du Berthiand is a mountain pass rising to  above sea level, situated on the Montagne de Berthiand in the Jura mountains. It is located in the department of Ain in France and joins the commune of Serrières-sur-Ain with Nurieux-Volognat.

Toponymy
The name, like those of the Montagne de Berthiand and the hamlet of Berthiand originate from Bertoldingos ("with the Bertoldingi") derived from the family name Bertoald.

Cycling
The Tour de France has traversed the Col du Berthiand on four occasions, the last being during the 2016 Tour de France, with Rafał Majka first over the top. The riders who crossed in the lead are shown in the table:

In the more distant past, it illustrated the skill of Charly Gaul, in particular during the Circuit des Six-Provinces in 1954, but also during the Tour des provinces du Sud-Est in 1955.

References

Mountain passes of the Jura
Landforms of Ain